Something New is a 2006 American romantic comedy drama film directed by Sanaa Hamri. The screenplay by Kriss Turner focuses on interracial relationships and traditional African American family values and social customs.

Plot
Kenya McQueen is a successful, single African American woman who has sacrificed romance in order to pursue a career as a certified public accountant. Her rigid desire for perfection and control has manifested itself in the bland, monochromatic decor of her new home and the rigid rules she follows in her personal life. Urged to loosen up by her friends, Kenya accepts a blind date with landscape architect Brian Kelly arranged by her co-worker Leah Cahan, who is in the process of planning the kind of wedding Kenya wants herself. The two meet at Starbucks, and she is surprised to discover Brian is white. She quickly excuses herself and leaves.

The two unexpectedly meet again at a party at Leah's parents' home, where Brian landscaped the grounds. Impressed with his work, Kenya decides to hire him to renovate her unkempt backyard garden. As time passes, their employer-employee relationship evolves into a friendship and then love.

Although Brian is helping her feel more comfortable about her living environment, Kenya finds it difficult to dismiss her reservations about their romance. The opinions of her girlfriends Cheryl, Nedra, and Suzette, her upper class parents Joyce and Edmond, and her womanizing younger brother Nelson begin to have a deleterious effect and Brian's unwillingness to discuss issues of color drives them apart.

Nelson introduces his sister to someone she views as a more acceptable suitor, tax attorney Mark Harper, who has just relocated to Los Angeles. The two begin to date, and while Joyce thoroughly approves, Edmond senses his daughter is not as happy as she was with Brian. Everything Kenya thought she wanted suddenly seems immaterial, and nothing Mark does ignites a spark between them. When the dissonance she's developed finally overwhelms her, Kenya chooses to reunite with Brian, no longer allowing her controlling nature and social norms to dictate matters of the heart.

Kenya marries Brian amongst their closest friends and loved ones.

Cast
 Sanaa Lathan as Kenya Denise McQueen
 Simon Baker as Brian Kelly
 Blair Underwood as Mark Harper
 Donald Faison as Nelson McQueen, Kenya's brother
 Alfre Woodard as Joyce McQueen, Kenya's mother
 Earl Billings as Edmond McQueen, Kenya's father
 Katharine Towne as Leah Cahan
 Stanley DeSantis as Jack Pino
 Mike Epps as Walter, Cheryl's husband
 Julie Mond as Penelope, Brian's Ex
 Lee Garlington as Mrs. Cahan
 Taraji P. Henson as Nedra, Kenya's friend
 Wendy Raquel Robinson as Cheryl, Kenya's friend
 Golden Brooks as Suzette, Kenya's friend
 Tanisha Harper as Stacy

Critical reception
Something New received generally positive reviews from critics. The website's critical consensus reads: "Something New tackles serious questions about race and interracial relationships with genuine appeal and an alluring romance that develops as naturally as the plot." On Metacritic, the film received an average score of 64 out of 100, based on 28 reviews, indicating "generally favorable reviews".

Manohla Dargis of The New York Times called the film "a pleasantly diverting romance ... [in which] the chemistry between the leads is as unmistakable as the setup is contrived ... The lovely Ms. Lathan ... and the similarly attractive Mr. Baker ... don't just look good together; they feel right in sync. Their easy, sensual rapport partly owes something to the generally sure hand of the film's director, Sanaa Hamri, making a fine feature debut, and something else, something indefinable, to the delectable mysteries of two bodies in cinematic motion."

Roger Ebert of the Chicago Sun-Times rated the film 3½ out of four stars and commented, "I found myself unexpectedly moved." He continued, "By the end, Something New delivers all the usual pleasures of a love story, and something more. The movie respects its subject and characters, and is more complex about race than we could possibly expect. With this film and the completely different but also observant Queen Latifah comedy Last Holiday, black women are being paid a kind of attention they deserve but rarely get in the movies."

Kevin Crust of the Los Angeles Times called the film "superficial and formulaic but pleasant enough to entertain and qualifies as intelligent and sophisticated by the current standard of Hollywood comedy." He added, "The movie nicely captures the area around Baldwin Hills, is crisply written by Kriss Turner and portrays the upper-middle class black community seldom seen in mainstream TV and film. However, the characterizations, even the leads, rarely rise above archetypes. The film's lack of depth as it oversimplifies the complexities of racism keep it from being anything other than a lightweight date movie."

Ruthe Stein of the San Francisco Chronicle said, "The trouble with the movie is that it sometimes seems at odds with itself, vacillating between a realistic presentation of the obstacles black professional women face finding a suitable mate and another bit of Hollywood fluff where their skin color is glossed over."

Steve Persall of the St. Petersburg Times graded the film B and commented, "I like the way Something New presents facets of African-American life seldom seen in mainstream movies, such as the formality and brief funkiness of a debutante cotillion ball, the affluent sophistication making such events important. I like Hamri's approach to material that might be offensive from a solidly black or white perspective. It all makes the foundational sameness of the story easier to take. The basic story isn't new, but telling it this way is really something."

Brian Lowry of Variety observed, "Wispy at best, this romantic comedy from a first-time director and screenwriter feels as if whole chunks have been left on the cutting-room floor, with what remains mustering intermittent charm thanks to the attractiveness, if not chemistry, of Sanaa Lathan and Simon Baker ... Perhaps the best thing the movie has going for it, actually, is that despite the title, there's really nothing new here at all; rather, the beats are so familiar the audience can fill in the gaps themselves."

Award and nominations
 NAACP Image Award for Outstanding Actress in a Motion Picture (Sanaa Lathan, nominee)
 NAACP Image Award for Best Director of a Feature Film or Television Movie (Sanaa Hamri, nominee)
 Black Reel Award for Best Screenplay (Kriss Turner, winner)
 Black Reel Award for Best Film (nominee)
 Black Reel Award for Best Actress (Sanaa Lathan, nominee)
 Black Reel Award for Best Director (Sanaa Hamri, nominee)
 Black Reel Award for Best Original Score (nominee)
 Black Reel Award for Best Original Soundtrack (nominee)
 Black Movie Award for Outstanding Achievement in Screenwriting (Kriss Turner, winner)
 Black Movie Award for Outstanding Performance by an Actress in a Lead Role (Sanaa Lathan, nominee)
 Black Movie Award for Outstanding Performance by an Actress in a Supporting Role (Alfre Woodard, nominee)

DVD release
On May 16, 2006, the film was released on DVD in Region 1 in two versions, one in anamorphic widescreen and the other in fullscreen format. Both have an English audio track and subtitles in English, Spanish, and French. Bonus features include an introduction by Blair Underwood, The Making of Something New, and The Dos and Don'ts of Dating.

See also 
 Guess Who (film)

References

External links
 Official website
 
 
 

2006 films
2006 comedy films
2006 directorial debut films
2006 drama films
2006 independent films
2006 romantic comedy-drama films
2000s American films
2000s English-language films
African-American romantic comedy-drama films
African-American films
American independent films
Films about interracial romance
Films about obsessive–compulsive disorder
Films directed by Sanaa Hamri
Films set in Los Angeles
Focus Features films